Mel Y. Chen is an academic whose scholarship intersects many fields, including queer theory, gender studies, animal studies, critical race theory, Asian American studies, disability studies, science studies, and critical linguistics. Chen (who uses they/them/their pronouns) is currently Associate Professor of Gender & Women's Studies and Director of the Center for the Study of Sexual Culture at the University of California, Berkeley as well as a member of the Board of Directors of the Society for Disability Studies.

Chen's first book, Animacies: Biopolitics, Racial Mattering, and Queer Affect (2012) was published by Duke University Press and received the Modern Language Association’s GL/Q Caucus' Alan Bray Memorial Book Prize for its contribution to lesbian, gay, bisexual, transgender, and/or queer studies in literature and cultural studies. In Animacies, Chen explores the ways in which race, sexuality, and ability are often tied to the basic hierarchical categories that define matter: human, animal and thing.

Chen received a Ph.D. in Linguistics from U.C. Berkeley.

References

UC Berkeley College of Letters and Science alumni
Year of birth missing (living people)
Living people